is a Japanese weekly anthology magazine published in Tokyo each Monday by Kodansha. The magazine started on June 16, 1980, and is targeted at the adult male (seinen) demographic. It was published bimonthly (under the title ), on the second and fourth Mondays of every month, until switching to a weekly publication in 1989. The chapters of the series that run in Weekly Young Magazine are collected and published in tankōbon volumes under the "YoungKC" imprint every four months.

The magazine usually features color photos of pinup girl  on the cover and first few pages of each issue.

Since December 9, 2009, Kodansha has published a monthly sister magazine, a retitled makeover of their previous publication , which had published a total of 36 bimonthly issues during its existence.

Series in publication
There are currently 25 manga titles serialized in Weekly Young Magazine. Out of them, Seven Shakespeares: Non Sanz Droict, Kenka Kagyō and Nande Koko ni Sensei ga!? are on hiatus.

Past series

1980s 
  by Kenshi Hirokane (1980–1989)
  by Masayuki Katayama (1982–1987)
 Akira by Katsuhiro Otomo (1982–1990)
  by Kazuhiro Kiuchi (1983–2003)
  by Minetarō Mochizuki (1985–1988)
  by Michiharu Kusunoki (1986–1996)
  by Harold Sakuishi (1988–1993)
 3×3 Eyes by Yuzo Takada (1989–2002) (transferred from Young Magazine Zōkan Kaizokuban)

1990s 
  by Masamune Shirow (1991–1996)
  by Michiharu Kusunoki (1992–2008)
  by Tetsu Adachi (1992–1994)
  by Minoru Furuya (1993–1996)
  by Minetaro Mochizuki (1994–1999)
  by Shuichi Shigeno (1995–2013)
  by Yanwari Kazama (1995–2013)
  by Nobuyuki Fukumoto (1996–1999)
  by Masamune Shirow (1997)
  by Akira Hiramoto (1998–2009)
  by Shigemitsu Harada (1998–2000)
  by Moyoco Anno (1999–2003)
  by Hiroshi Tanaka (1999–2004)
  by Katsuhisa Minami (1999–2006)

2000s 
  by Baba Yasushi (2000–2012)
  by Nobuyuki Fukumoto (2000–2004)
  CLAMP (2001–2002)
 Higanjima by Kōji Matsumoto (2002–2010)
 Kyō no Go no Ni by Koharu Sakuraba (2002–2003)
  by Tadashi Agi and Tetsuya Koshiba (2002–2004)
 xxxHolic by CLAMP (2003–2011)
  by Naoki Serizawa (2003–2009)
  by Kōji Kōno (2004–2007)
  by Nobuyuki Fukumoto (2004–2008)
  by Tsutomu Nihei (2004) (transferred to Shueisha's Ultra Jump in May 2006)
  by Shūzō Oshimi (2004)
 Kenka Shōbai by Yasuaki Kita (2005–2011)
  by Dragon Odawara (2005–2011)
Shinjuku Swan by Ken Wakui (2005–2013)
  by Hiromoto Komatsu (2006–2011)
  by Bow Ditama (2008–2009) (transferred to Monthly Young Magazine in December 2009)  by Tomonori Inoue (2008–2016)
  by Nobuyuki Fukumoto (2009–2012)
  by Hiroshi Kisashi (2009–2010)

 2010s 
  by Jun Watanabe (2010–2015)
  by Yukai Asada (2010–2011)
  by Akira Hiramoto (2011–2017)
  by Yuma Ando and Masashi Asaki (2011–2014) (indefinite hiatus)
 Green Blood by Masasumi Kakizaki (2011–2013)
  by Shin Takahashi (2011–2013)
  by Dragon Odawara (2011–2012)
  by Kaori Saki (2012–2015)
  by Hiyoko Kobayashi (2012–2020)
  by Dragon Odawara (2012–2014)
  by CLAMP (2013–2017) (indefinite hiatus)
  by Nobuyuki Fukumoto (2013–2017)¨
  by Shin Takahashi (2013–2015)
  by Kei Ogawa (2013)
  by NON (2014–2019)
  by Katsuhisa Minami (2014–2019)
  by Jasmine Gyuh (2015–2018)
  by Mitsuru Hattori (2015–2016)
  by Azu (2016–2021)
  by Kentarō Okamoto and Riri Sagara (2017–2022)
  by Yousuke Nakamura (2017)
  by Hajime Inoryū and Shōta Itō (2018–2019) (transferred to Comic Days website in August 2019)
  by Hitomi Takano (2018–2020)
  by Moriko Mori and Cota Tomimura (2018–2022)
  by Naoki Azuma and Shouji Koukami (2018–2020)
  by Gino0808 (2019–2020)
  by Takeshi Taka (2019–2020)
  by Yuichirō Koga (2019–2020)
  by Tsukasa Monma and Yoshiki Kanata (2019–2020)
  by Meguru Ueno (2019–2021)
  by Masa Ichikawa (2019–2020)

 2020s 
  by Keito Gaku (2020)
  by Edogawa Edogawa (2020–2021)
  by Matsuki Ikka (2020–2021)
 God of Dog'' by Kō Kimura (2020–2021)
  by Hakaru Takarai (2020–2021)
  by Morion Airline and Akeji Fujimura (2020–2021)
  by Mao Ningen and Misao (2020–2021)
  by Fumitaka Katō (2020–2021)
  by Ringo Yōtō (2021)
  (2021) by Jun Endō
  by Yuto Uchida and Ryuki Ōnuma (2021)

Circulation

References

External links
 

1980 establishments in Japan
Weekly manga magazines published in Japan
Kodansha magazines
Magazines established in 1980
Seinen manga magazines
Magazines published in Tokyo